Pastissets,  also called casquetes, pastelicos, dulces de alma or flaons are stuffed fried pastries from Catalan cuisine, Valencian cuisine and Aragonese cuisine. They can be filled with cabell d'àngel jam, sweet potato jam, or almonds, even with mató cheese and codonyat. They are typical of Terres de l'Ebre and in Valencian Community. In Mallorca, there is a very similar preparation called rubiol.

Preparation
In Amposta they are made with a mixture of olive oil, flour, eggs, Catalan moscatell and anissette, which is cut in circles. They are stuffed, folded by the middle and closed by pressing softly, often with a fork. They are cooked and covered with sugar.

Gallery

See also
Catalan cuisine
 List of doughnut varieties
 List of fried dough varieties

External links
 

Catalan cuisine
Valencian cuisine
Stuffed dishes
Spanish pastries
Fried dough